The following lists events that happened during 1973 in Rhodesia.

Incumbents
 President: Clifford Dupont
 Prime Minister: Ian Smith

Events
9 January - Rhodesia closes its borders with Zambia due to the Zambians harbouring guerrillas.
4 February - Rhodesia re-opens its borders to Zambia but the Zambian side remained closed.
22 May - Britain and United States veto a United Nations Security Council Resolution to extend sanctions against Rhodesia.
21–25 June - A British delegation, led by Denis Greenhill visit Rhodesia for talks with the Rhodesian government and Bishop Abel Muzorewa, African National Council.
17 July - Ian Smith, the Rhodesian Prime Minister and Bishop Abel Muzorewa, African National Council(ANC) meet.

References

 
Years of the 20th century in Zimbabwe
Rhodesia
1970s in Rhodesia
Rhodesia